Canonica d'Adda is a comune (municipality) in the Province of Bergamo in the Italian region of Lombardy, located about  northeast of Milan and about  southwest of Bergamo.

It lies on the left bank of the river Adda which separates it from Vaprio d'Adda and is here the boundary between the Province of Bergamo and the Province of Milan. Canonica d'Adda also borders the municipalities of Brembate, Capriate San Gervasio, Fara Gera d'Adda and Pontirolo Nuovo.

References

External links

 Official website